N17 may refer to:

Roads
 N17 road (Belgium), a National Road of Belgium
 Route nationale 17, in France
 N17 road (Ireland)
 N17 (South Africa)
 Nebraska Highway 17, in the United States

Other uses 
 N17 (band), an American industrial metal band
 N17 (Long Island bus)
 "N17" (song), a 1991 song by The Saw Doctors
 , a submarine of the Royal Navy
 Nieuport 17, a French First World War fighter
 Nissan Almera (N17), a Japanese automobile
 Nitrogen-17, an isotope of nitrogen
 N17, a postcode district in the N postcode area